= League of British Muslims =

Islamic organization based in the United Kingdom

The League of British Muslims is an association of British Muslims, founded in 1969, and formed to support Muslim led voluntary activity in the United Kingdom.

As of 2015 its mission "is to improve inter-faith understanding and tolerance between Muslim and non-Muslim organisations."
